Plakortis hooperi is a species of marine sponge in the order Homosclerophorida, first described in 2011 by Guilherme Muricy. The species epithet, hooperi, honours John Hooper (marine biologist), an Australian sponge specialist.

Distribution
The holotype was collected off Motupore Island, Round Hill Barrier Reef, Papua New Guinea and the species is known from Papua New Guinea and the northern coasts of Queensland.

References

Homoscleromorpha
Animals described in 2011
Sponges of Australia
Taxa named by Guilherme Muricy